Vēḷ Pari was a ruler of Vēḷir lineage, who ruled Parambu nādu  and surrounding regions in ancient Tamilakam towards the end of the Sangam era. The name is often used to describe the most famous amongst them, who was the patron and friend of poet Kapilar and is extolled for his benevolence, patronage of art and literature. He is remembered as one of the Kadai ēzhu vallal (literally meaning, the last seven great patrons) in Tamil literature.

Ascension and rule
Pāri is described as the master of the hill country of Parambu nādu and held sway over 300 prosperous villages. Pari patronized various forms of art, literature and bards thronged his court. Parambu nadu consisted of parts of modern-day Tamil Nadu and Kerala stretching from Piranmalai in Sivaganga district, Tamil Nadu to Nedungadi in Palakkad district, Kerala. His favorite was poet Kapilar who was his close friend and lifelong companion. From Purananuru, song 107 by Kapilar:

Pāri was noted in of the last Sangam era for his generosity and was popular as one among the Kadai Ezhu Vallalgal (last seven patrons). Pāri's fame is described in Sangam literature as "முல்லைக்கு தேர் கொடுத்தான் பாரி" (One who gave his chariot to a climber plant). He was so generous that he gave away his chariot to a climber plant when he saw that it was struggling to grow without a suitable support.

Siege and death
The three crowned Tamil kings Cheras, Cholas and Pandyas expanded their kingdoms ruthlessly and turned their attention towards independent Vēḷir Kings thus turning them into subordinates or eliminating them and assimilated their kingdoms. They laid siege to the heavily fortified country of Parambu, but Vēḷ Pāri refused to give in and the war dragged for years. Kabilar approached the kings and asked them to turn back describing his patron Pari as an unconquerable warrior (excerpt from Purananuru: song 109):

After a long war, enemies begged for Paari life and so he donated it by taking a sword Vēḷ Pāri killed himself.  Purananuru, song (112) of Pāri's daughters on his death:

Family and succession
Pāri and his wife Aadhini had two daughters, Angavai and Sangavai. Kapilar become their guardian after Pari's death and the three of them left Parambu country. Kapilar unsuccessfully approach different Vēlir kings to find grooms. Kapilar later killed himself by vadakirrutal, one of the Tamil ways of committing suicide. Later, poet Auvaiyar takes care of them and marries them successfully to another king called Malaiyamaan Thirumudi Kaari.

Legacy
Pariyur ("place of Pāri") or Parapuri near Gobichettipalayam in Tamil Nadu is named after Pāri. After Pāri was defeated, the place was deserted towards the end of thirteenth century A.D. and people migrated to settle down in neighboring areas what became the modern day town of Gobichettipalayam. Pariyur has four temples dedicated to various Gods namely, Kondathu Kaliamman Temple, Amarapaneeswarar Temple, Adinarayana Perumal Temple and Angalamman Temple.

Pāri's daughters were married to the son of Kāri at Manam Poondi near Tirukkoyilur.

In popular culture
 Velpari by S. Venkatesan

Notes

References
Topics in South Indian history: from early times up to 1565 A.D. By A. Krishnaswami
Epigraphia Indica, Volume 25 By Devadatta Ramakrishna Bhandarkar, India. Archaeological Survey, India. Dept. of Archaeology
Traditions of Indian classical dance By Mohan Khokar
Poets of the Tamil Anthologies: Ancient Poems of Love and War, George L. Hart III, Princeton: Princeton University Press
Great women of India edited by Mādhavānanda (Swāmĭ.), Ramesh Chandra Majumdar
Poems of love and war: from the eight anthologies and the ten long poems of classical Tamil By A. K. Ramanujan
The Four Hundred Songs of War and Wisdom: An Anthology of Poems from Classical Tamil, the Purananuru, Translations from the Asian classics By George L. Hart, Hank Heifetz

Tamil monarchs
Indian philanthropists
Kadai ezhu vallal